The Pandur is an APC developed and produced by the Austrian company Steyr-Daimler-Puch Spezialfahrzeuge (SSF). It was developed during the 1980s as a private venture. In 2003, General Dynamics took over Steyr-Daimler-Puch which is now part of General Dynamics European Land Systems (GD ELS), which is also the parent company of MOWAG, Santa Bárbara Sistemas and GD ELS – Germany.

Armament
The baseline vehicle is armed with a 12.7 mm (.50 cal) heavy machine gun. Its modular design allows it to be fitted with a variety of weapon systems, including a 20 mm autocannon and an armored two-man 90 mm gun turret. Some Slovenian Pandur 1 (Valuk) are armed with a 40mm automatic grenade launchers with different ammunition like HE, HEDP, smoke and so on.

Variants
 Pandur I
 Model A – extended centre roof
 Armoured Personnel Carrier
 Ambulance
 Anti-tank vehicle
 Repair and recovery vehicle
 Command post vehicle
 Infantry fighting vehicle (Valuk)
 Model B – flat roof
 Amphibious vehicle – greater buoyancy and is propelled in the water by two water jets
 Mortar carrier
 Reconnaissance Fire Support Vehicle
 Pandur II

The Pandur I is no longer in production and has been replaced by the improved Pandur II, which is available in 6×6 and 8×8 versions.

Operators

  – Introduced to the Austrian Army in 1996 (71 vehicles) + 32 Pandur EVO. Additional 32 Pandur EVO on order.
  – Belgian Army (60, built in Belgium)
  - Gabonese Army (1 vehicle)
  – Kuwait National Guard (70 in 6 versions, produced by AV Technology),
  – Slovenian Army (85, produced under license, locally known as Valuk). Slovenian army requested 14 new Pandur EVO in late 2019. Austria is offering a government to government contract with Slovenia as GDELS is willing to offer the 14 Pandur EVO to the army. Currently waiting for the new government to decide for the purchase. Estimated cost is around 40 million Euro.
  – US Army (50, produced by AV Technology as the Armored Ground Mobility System for USASOC)

Related designs
 Pandur II

Notes

External links
 Steyr-Daimler-Puch Spezialfahrzeug GmbH
 Images of Pandur in service with the Austrian Army

Wheeled armoured personnel carriers
Armoured personnel carriers of Austria
Six-wheeled vehicles
Military vehicles introduced in the 1990s
Amphibious armoured personnel carriers